George Eden, 1st Earl of Auckland,  (25 August 1784 – 1 January 1849) was an English Whig politician and colonial administrator. He was thrice First Lord of the Admiralty and also served as Governor-General of India between 1836 and 1842. The province of Auckland, which includes the present regions of Northland, Auckland, Waikato, Bay of Plenty and Gisborne along with the city of Auckland, in New Zealand, was named after him.

Lord Auckland signed the Tripartite Treaty in June 1838 with Maharaja Ranjit Singh of the Sikh Empire and Shah Shuja of Afghanistan.

Background and education
Born in Beckenham, Kent, Auckland was the second son of William Eden, 1st Baron Auckland, and Eleanor, daughter of Sir Gilbert Elliot, 3rd Baronet. His sister was the traveller and author Emily Eden, who would visit India for long periods and write about her experiences. He was educated at Eton, and Christ Church, Oxford, and was called to the Bar, Lincoln's Inn, in 1809. He became heir apparent to the barony after his elder brother William Eden drowned in the Thames in 1810.

Political career, 1810–1836
Auckland was returned to Parliament for Woodstock in 1810 (succeeding his elder brother, William), a seat he held until 1812, and again between 1813 and 1814. The latter year he succeeded his father in the barony and took his seat in the House of Lords, supporting the reform party. In 1830 he became President of the Board of Trade and Master of the Mint under Lord Grey, and serving as one of the deputy Speakers of the House of Lords.

He was First Lord of the Admiralty under Grey and then Lord Melbourne in 1834 and again under Melbourne in 1835. He gave a commission to William Hobson to sail for the East Indies, which Hobson ultimately rewarded in the naming of his newly created city of Auckland, New Zealand in 1840. Mount Eden in Auckland, the town of Eden, New South Wales and Auckland County, New South Wales were also named after him.

Governor-General of India, 1836–1842
In 1836 Lord Auckland was appointed of Governor-General of India.  His private secretary was John Russell Colvin, who rose to be lieutenant-governor of the North-West Provinces and named his son Auckland Colvin after him. As a legislator, he dedicated himself especially to the improvement of native schools and the expansion of the commercial industry of India.

But complications in Afghanistan interrupted this work in 1838. Lord Auckland decided on war, and on 1 October 1838 in Simla published the Simla Manifesto, dethroning Dost Mahommed Khan. After successful early operations he was created Baron Eden, of Norwood in the County of Surrey, and Earl of Auckland. However the Afghan campaign ultimately ended in disaster. He handed over the governor-generalship to Lord Ellenborough and returned to England the following year.

Political career, 1842–1849
In 1846 he again became First Lord of the Admiralty, this time under Lord John Russell. In the words of a modern historian: "[M]inisterial talent in the House of Lords was not so plentiful as to disqualify the author of one of the worst disasters in British military history". He held this office until his death three years later.

Personal life and character
Lord Auckland died on New Year's Day 1849, following what was described as a fit. He was aged 64. Lord Auckland was unmarried and on his death the earldom became extinct, while he was succeeded in the barony by his younger brother, Robert.

In a recently published (2013) history Lord Auckland is described as "a clever and capable but somewhat complacent and detached Whig nobleman". In appearance he was slim and younger looking than his years. As a respected First Lord of the Admiralty Lord Auckland depended heavily on competent staff but his indecisive personality and indifference to Indian history and culture led to disastrous decisions being made during his term as Governor-General there.

References

Further reading

External links

1784 births
1849 deaths
Alumni of Christ Church, Oxford
Earls in the Peerage of the United Kingdom
2
George Eden
Governors-General of India
Knights Grand Cross of the Order of the Bath
Lords of the Admiralty
Masters of the Mint
Members of the Parliament of the United Kingdom for English constituencies
UK MPs 1807–1812
UK MPs 1812–1818
UK MPs who inherited peerages
UK MPs who were granted peerages
Whig (British political party) MPs for English constituencies
British military personnel of the First Anglo-Afghan War
Presidents of the Royal Asiatic Society
Members of the Privy Council of the United Kingdom
Younger sons of barons
Presidents of the Board of Trade
Peers of the United Kingdom created by Queen Victoria
Committee members of the Society for the Diffusion of Useful Knowledge